is a Japanese kickboxer, currently fighting for the RISE organization.

As of October 2021 he was the #2 ranked strawweight kickboxer in the world by Combat Press.

Kickboxing career

DEEP KICK
Kazane made his professional debut in the DEEP KICK Freshman Tournament, held at DEEP☆KICK 25 on May 24, 2015. He was scheduled to face Kyosuke Nishida in a two-round semifinal bout. Kazane won the fight by unanimous decision, with scores of 20–19, 20–19 and 20–18. Advancing to the finals, Kazane faced Yuto Kuroda in a three-round, three minute bout. He once again won by unanimous decision, with all three judges scoring the fight 30–27 in his favor.

Kazane was scheduled to face Ryota Naito at DEEP☆KICK 27 on September 21, 2015. Following a relatively even first round, Naito scored a knockdown with a head kick in the second round. Although he was unable to finish Kazane, Naito won the fight by unanimous decision, with scores of 29–27, 29–27 and 30–28.

Kazane was scheduled to face Takasuke Sekimoto at DEEP☆KICK 28 on December 23, 2015. Kazane won the fight by a second-round technical knockout, finishing Sekimoto with punches after knocking him down with a knee strike.

HOOST CUP
Kazane was scheduled to make his promotional debut with HOOST CUP against Koudai Hirayama at HOOST CUP KINGS OSAKA on October 2, 2016. He suffered his second professional loss by unanimous decision. Following this loss, Kazane was scheduled to face Kai Hasegawa at HOOST CUP KINGS Kyoto 2 on March 5, 2017. He won the fight by a first-round knockout. He won his next fight against Kyosuke at HOOST CUP KINGS Kyoto 3 on July 9, 2017, by a third-round technical knockout, winning two consecutive fights for the first time since his professional debut.

Kazane was scheduled to face Koki Osaki at HOOST CUP KINGS NAGOYA 3 on September 30, 2017. Osaki won the fight by unanimous decision, snapping Kazane's two fight streak, with all three judges scoring the fight 30–25. Kazane was knocked down twice in the fight, in the first and third rounds, both times with a right straight.

Kazane was scheduled to fight a rematch with Kyosuke at HOOST CUP KINGS OSAKA 2 on November 26, 2017. He won the closely contested fight by majority decision, with scores of 29–29, 30–29 and 30–29.

Kazane was scheduled to face King Takeshi at HOOST CUP KINGS KYOTO 4 on February 25, 2018. He lost the fight by unanimous decision, with scores of 29–28, 30–28 and 30–27.

Kazane returned to DEEP KICK for his next fight, following a three-year absence from the promotion. He was scheduled to face Hiroki Matsuoka at DEEP☆KICK 36 on July 1, 2018. Kazane scored the singular knockdown of the fight with a head kick in the first round. He won the fight by unanimous decision, with scores of 29–28, 29–28 and 30–27.

RISE
In March 2019, Kazane signed with RISE and moved to the Team Teppen gym. He was scheduled to make his promotional debut against Yusei Murai at RISE 131 on March 23, 2019. Kazane won the fight by a second-round knockout.

Kazane was scheduled to face Hiroki Matsuoka at RISE EVOL.4 on June 14, 2019. He won the fight by unanimous decision, with scores of 30–28, 30–29 and 30–28. 

Kazane was scheduled to face Reiya at RISE 134 on September 29, 2019. He won the fight by a second-round technical knockout, successfully knocking Reiya down three times in under two minutes.

Kazane was scheduled to face Kiri Matsutani at RISE 135 on November 4, 2019. As the fight was ruled a draw following the first three rounds, the two of them fought an additional round, after which Kazane was awarded a unanimous decision.

Kazane's five-fight winning streak was snapped by Kazuki Osaki at RISE 137 on February 23, 2020. Osaki knocked Kazane twice during the bout and won the bout by unanimous decision. Two of the judges scored the fight 29–27 for Osaki, while the third judge scored all three rounds in his favor. Kazane suffered an injury during this fight, which sidelined him for the rest of the year.

Kazane was scheduled to face Hiroyuki at RISE 146 on February 23, 2021. He won the fight by unanimous decision, with all three judges scoring the fight 30–28.

RISE World Series
Kazane participated in the 2021 RISE World Series 53kg tournament. He was scheduled to fight the three-time Rajadamnern Stadium title challenger Mutsuki Ebata in the tournament quarterfinals, held on July 18, 2021. Although he came into the fight as the underdog, Kazane won the fight by split decision. The fight was ruled a majority draw after the first three rounds, with two judges scoring the fight 29–29 and 30–30, while the third judge scored the fight 30–29 for Kazane. Kazane was awarded the decision after an extra round was fought, with two judges giving him the nod.

Kazane was scheduled to face Jin Mandokoro in the tournament semifinals, held on September 23, 2021. Mandokoro advanced to the semifinals with a unanimous decision win against Toki Tamaru in the quarterfinals. He won the closely contested fight by majority decision, with two judges scoring the fight 30-29 in his favor, while the third judge scored it as a 29-29 draw. Kazane faced the 2020 Rise Dead or Alive Super Bantamweight tournament winner Shiro in the finals. The fight was ruled a majority draw after the first three rounds, with two judges scoring it as a 29-29 and 30-30 draw respectively, while the third judge scored it as 30-29 for Kazane. Kazane was awarded the unanimous decision after an extra round was fought. During the post-fight interview, he stated his desire to fight his teammate Tenshin Nasukawa in his next fight.

Kazane vs. Tenshin
Kazane was booked to face the former two-weight RISE champion Tenshin Nasukawa at Rise El Dorado 2022 on April 2, 2022, in what was Nasukawa's last fight with the promotion. Nasukawa was considered one of the best pound for pound kickboxer in the world at the time of the bout's scheduling. Kazane lost the closely contested bout by majority decision. Two of the judges scored the fight 30–29 for Nasukawa, while the third judge scored the fight an even 29–29.

Continued bantamweight career
Kazane faced the 2021 K-1 Japan Grand Prix winner Toma Kuroda at The Match 2022, the K-1 and RISE cross-promotional event, on June 19, 2022. The fight was ruled a split decision draw following the first three rounds, with one judge scored the bout an even 30–30, while the remaining two judges awarded a 30–29 scorecard to Kazane and Kuroda respectively. Kazane was awarded a unanimous decision victory after an extra fourth round was contested.

Kazane challenged Kazuki Osaki for the RISE Super Flyweight (-53 kg) Championship at RISE Word Series 2022 on October 15, 2022. Osaki was at the time regarded as the best kickboxer under 54 kg and one of the best pound for pound fighters in the world. Kazane lost the fight by a close majority decision, with scores of 50–49, 48–48 and 49–48.

Kazane faced the RISE Flyweight (-51.5 kg) champion Toki Tamaru at RISE EL DORADO 2023 on March 26, 2023. The bout was contested at a -54 kg catchweight and served as a qualifier for the 2023 RISE World Series.

Championships and accomplishments
Amateur
 2012 Kyoken Junior Kick Jr. Middleweight Champion
Professional
DEEP KICK
2015 DEEP☆KICK -53kg Freshman Tournament Winner
RISE
2021 RISE -53kg Dead or Alive Tournament Winner

Fight record

|-  style="text-align:center; background:#"
| 2023-03-26 || ||align=left| Toki Tamaru || RISE ELDORADO 2023 || Tokyo, Japan ||  || ||
|-
|-  style="text-align:center; background:#fbb"
| 2022-10-15|| Loss ||align=left| Kazuki Osaki || RISE Word Series 2022|| Tokyo, Japan || Decision (Majority) || 5 || 3:00 
|-
! style=background:white colspan=9 |

|-  style="text-align:center; background:#cfc"
| 2022-06-19 || Win ||align=left| Toma Kuroda || THE MATCH 2022 || Tokyo, Japan || Ext.R Decision (Unanimous)|| 4||3:00
|-  style="text-align:center; background:#fbb"
| 2022-04-02 || Loss ||align=left| Tenshin Nasukawa || RISE El Dorado 2022 || Tokyo, Japan || Decision (Majority) || 3 ||3:00
|-  style="background:#cfc;"
| 2021-09-23|| Win ||align=left| Shiro || RISE WORLD SERIES 2021 Yokohama – Dead or Alive Tournament,  Final || Yokohama, Japan || Ext.R Decision (Unanimous) || 4 || 3:00
|-
! style=background:white colspan=9 |
|-  style="background:#cfc;"
| 2021-09-23|| Win ||align=left| Jin Mandokoro || RISE WORLD SERIES 2021 Yokohama – Dead or Alive Tournament, Semi Final || Yokohama, Japan || Decision (Majority)|| 3 ||3:00
|-  style="background:#cfc;"
| 2021-07-18||Win||align=left| Mutsuki Ebata || RISE WORLD SERIES 2021 Osaka – Dead or Alive Tournament, Quarter Final || Osaka, Japan || Ext.R Decision (Split) || 4 ||3:00
|-  style="background:#cfc;"
| 2021-02-23 || Win ||align=left| Hiroyuki|| RISE 146 || Tokyo, Japan||Decision (Unanimous)|| 3 || 3:00
|-  style="background:#fbb;"
| 2020-02-23 ||Loss||align=left| Kazuki Osaki || RISE 137 || Tokyo, Japan|| Decision (Unanimous) || 3 || 3:00
|-  style="background:#cfc;"
| 2019-11-04 || Win ||align=left| Kiri Matsutani || RISE 135 || Tokyo, Japan|| Ext.R Decision (Unanimous)|| 4 || 3:00
|-  style="background:#cfc;"
| 2019-09-29 || Win ||align=left| Reiya || RISE 134 || Tokyo, Japan|| TKO (3 Knockdowns) || 2 || 1:52
|-  style="background:#cfc;"
| 2019-06-14 || Win ||align=left| Hiroki Matsuoka || RISE EVOL.4 || Tokyo, Japan||Decision (Unanimous)|| 3 || 3:00
|-  style="background:#cfc;"
| 2019-03-23 || Win ||align=left| Yusei Murai || RISE 131 || Tokyo, Japan|| KO (Punches)|| 2 || 2:06
|-  style="background:#cfc;"
| 2018-07-01 || Win ||align=left| Hiroki Matsuoka || DEEP☆KICK 36 || Osaka, Japan||Decision (Unanimous)|| 3 || 3:00
|-  style="background:#fbb;"
| 2018-02-25 || Loss ||align=left| King Takeshi || HOOST CUP KINGS KYOTO 4 || Kyoto, Japan||Decision (Unanimous)|| 3 || 3:00
|-  style="background:#cfc;"
| 2017-11-26 || Win ||align=left| Kyosuke || HOOST CUP KINGS OSAKA 2 || Osaka, Japan||Decision (Majority)|| 3 || 3:00
|-  style="background:#fbb;"
| 2017-09-30 || Loss ||align=left| Koki Osaki|| HOOST CUP KINGS NAGOYA 3|| Nagoya, Japan ||Decision (Unanimous)|| 3 || 3:00
|-  style="background:#cfc;"
| 2017-07-09 || Win ||align=left| Kyosuke || HOOST CUP KINGS Kyoto 3 || Kyoto, Japan|| TKO (Punches)|| 3 || 2:19
|-  style="background:#cfc;"
| 2017-03-05 || Win ||align=left| Kai Hasegawa || HOOST CUP KINGS Kyoto 2 || Kyoto, Japan|| TKO (Right Cross)|| 1 ||
|-  style="background:#fbb;"
| 2016-10-02 || Loss ||align=left| Koudai|| HOOST CUP KINGS OSAKA|| Osaka, Japan || Decision (Unanimous)|| 3 || 3:00
|-  style="background:#cfc;"
| 2015-12-23 || Win ||align=left| Takasuke Sekimoto || DEEP☆KICK 28|| Osaka, Japan || TKO (Punches)|| 2 || 2:24
|-  style="background:#fbb;"
| 2015-09-21 || Loss ||align=left| Ryota Naito || DEEP☆KICK 27|| Osaka, Japan || Decision (Unanimous)|| 3|| 3:00
|-  style="background:#cfc;"
| 2015-05-24 || Win ||align=left| Yuto Kuroda || DEEP☆KICK 25, Freshman Tournament Final|| Osaka, Japan || Decision (Unanimous)|| 3 || 3:00
|-
! style=background:white colspan=9 |
|-  style="background:#cfc;"
| 2015-05-24 || Win ||align=left| Kyosuke Nishida || DEEP☆KICK 25, Freshman Tournament Semi Final|| Osaka, Japan || Decision (Unanimous)|| 2 || 3:00
|-
| colspan=9 | Legend:    

|-  style="background:#CCFFCC;"
| 2015-04-26 ||Win ||align=left| Kaito Yamawaki || NEXT☆LEVEL Kansai 22 || Sakai, Japan|| Decision (Unanimous) || 2 || 2:00
|-  style="background:#fbb;"
| 2014-09-21 || Loss ||align=left| Shori Morishita || Crazy King vol.6|| Kobe, Japan || Decision || 3 ||3:00
|-  style="background:#cfc;"
| 2014-06-29 || Win ||align=left| Yutaka Iwakura || ALL BOX WORLD 4th|| Osaka, Japan || KO || 2 ||
|-  style="background:#CCFFCC;"
| 2013-07-07 ||Win ||align=left| Kazuya Oohara|| Kyoken Junior Kick 9 || Osaka, Japan|| Decision (Unanimous) || 2 || 2:00
|-  style="background:#c5d2ea;"
| 2013-05-26|| Draw || align=left| Begin Yoshioka || GLADIATOR 56|| Osaka, Japan || Decision || 2 ||2:00
|-  style="background:#CCFFCC;"
| 2013-05-12 ||Win ||align=left| Ryo Takahata || Kyoken Junior Kick 8 || Osaka, Japan|| Decision (Unanimous) || 2 || 2:00
|-  style="background:#fbb;"
| 2013-01-20 || Loss ||align=left| Taiga Imanaga || Kyoken Junior Kick 6, Quarter Final || Osaka, Japan|| Decision || 2 || 2:00
|-  style="background:#cfc;"
| 2012-12-05 || Win||align=left| Masao Mihara || RKS Amateur 5 || Osaka, Japan|| Decision || 2 || 2:00
|-  style="background:#fbb;"
| 2012-11-18 || Loss ||align=left| Taiga Imanaga || Kyoken Junior Kick, Semi Final || Osaka, Japan|| Decision || 2 || 2:00
|-  style="background:#cfc;"
| 2012-11-18 || Win ||align=left| Hiroto Ichimura || Kyoken Junior Kick, Quarter Final || Osaka, Japan|| Decision || 2 || 2:00
|-  style="background:#fbb;"
| 2012-11-18 || Loss ||align=left| Ryo Tokunaga || Kyoken Junior Kick, First Round || Osaka, Japan|| Decision || 2 || 2:00
|-  style="background:#CCFFCC;"
| 2012-09-02 ||Win ||align=left| Kakyo Sakai || Kyoken Junior Kick, Final || Osaka, Japan|| Decision (Majority) || 2 || 1:30 
|-
! style=background:white colspan=9 |
|-  style="background:#CCFFCC;"
| 2012-09-02 ||Win ||align=left| Shoki Kaneda || Kyoken Junior Kick, Semi Final || Osaka, Japan|| Decision || 2 || 1:30
|-  style="background:#CCFFCC;"
| 2012-09-23 ||Win ||align=left| Ryo Tokunaga || NEXT☆LEVEL Kansai 1 || Sakai, Japan|| Decision (Unanimous) || 2 || 1:30
|-  style="background:#fbb;"
| 2012-07-15 ||Loss ||align=left| Kakyo Sakai || Kyoken Junior Kick 3|| Osaka, Japan|| Decision (Unanimous) || 2 || 1:30
|-  style="background:#CCFFCC;"
| 2012-07-15 ||Win ||align=left| Shoki Kaneda || Kyoken Junior Kick 3|| Osaka, Japan|| Decision (Unanimous) || 2 || 1:30 
|-
| colspan=9 | Legend:

See also
 List of male kickboxers

References

1998 births
Living people
Japanese male kickboxers
Sportspeople from Kyoto